Bnei Yeechalal Rehovot (Hebrew: בני יצ'אלאל רחובות) is an Israeli football club based in Rehovot. The club is currently in Liga Bet South B division.

Background
Yeechalal (which means "Everything is possible" in the Amharic language), The Community Association of Ethiopian Immigrants for Advancement in Sport, was founded in 2000, in order to promote sports amongst youth from the Ethiopian immigrants community in Israel and take responsibility over their future.

History
Bnei Yeechalal Rehovot Football Club was founded in 2007 and joined Liga Gimel. In 2008–09, their second season of existence, the club finished on top of Liga Gimel Central division, level on points with Hapoel Rahat and F.C. Kiryat Gat, and had to face both clubs in a three-way promotion play-off. Bnei Yeechalal remained in Liga Gimel, after they lost both matches, 2–3 to F.C. Kiryat Gat and 1–3 to Hapoel Rahat. However, in the following season, they won their division and were promoted to Liga Bet.

The club's best placing to date was the sixth place in Liga Bet South B division, which was achieved in the 2014–15 season.

Honours

League

Cups

References

External links
Bnei Yeechalal Rehovot Israel Football Association 

Association football clubs established in 2007
Yeechalal Rehovot
2007 establishments in Israel
Ethiopian-Jewish culture in Israel
Sport in Rehovot